George Dudley Seymour State Park is a public recreation area occupying  on the east bank of the Connecticut River in the town of Haddam, Connecticut. Hurd State Park abuts the park to the north. The park bears the name of George Dudley Seymour (1859-1945), whose philanthropic efforts enabled the state to purchase land for this and several other Connecticut state parks. It is managed by the Connecticut Department of Energy and Environmental Protection.

History
The park was once the site of Clarkhurst, the estate of wealthy Higganum harrow manufacturers George, Henry and Thomas Clark. In addition to living at Clarkhurst, the family used the land as a testing ground for agricultural equipment. Henry Clark's daughter, who took possession in 1921, sought to develop the site for recreational use but the property saw steady decline with the coming of the Great Depression. It was owned by Marion Gutherie from 1942 until 1960, when it was purchased by the state for $60,000 using funds provided by the George Dudley Seymour Foundation.

Activities and amenities
Visitors to the park find a small parking area and hiking trails with interpretive signage. Hunting, fishing, and cross-country skiing are also offered.

References

External links
George Dudley Seymour State Park Connecticut Department of Energy and Environmental Protection
George Dudley Seymour State Park Map Connecticut Department of Energy and Environmental Protection

State parks of Connecticut
Parks in Middlesex County, Connecticut
Protected areas established in 1960
1960 establishments in Connecticut
Haddam, Connecticut